In molecular biology, the calcium-activated potassium channel beta subunit is a family of proteins comprising the beta subunits of calcium-activated potassium channels.

The functional diversity of potassium channels can arise through homo- or hetero-associations of alpha subunits or association with auxiliary cytoplasmic beta subunits. The beta subunit (which is thought to possess 2 transmembrane domains) increases the calcium sensitivity of the BK channel. It does this by enhancing the time spent by the channel in burst-like open states. However, it has little effect on the durations of closed intervals between bursts, or on the numbers of open and closed states entered during gating.

References

Protein families